1019 I Can Concert is a live video album by Taiwanese singer Jolin Tsai. It was released on March 16, 2000, by Universal and D Sound. It chronicled the 1019 I Can Concert at Nankang 101 in Taipei, Taiwan on December 4, 1999.

Background and release 
On September 10, 1999, Tsai released her debut studio album, 1019, which sold more than 450,000 copies in Taiwan. On December 4, 1999, Tsai held the 1019 I Can Concert at Nankang 101 in Taipei, Taiwan. On March 16, 2000, Tsai released her first live video album, 1019 I Can Concert, which chronicled the 1019 I Can Concert.

Track listing

Release history

References 

2000 live albums
2000 video albums
Jolin Tsai live albums
Jolin Tsai video albums
Universal Music Taiwan live albums
Universal Music Taiwan video albums